Miss Teen International 2022, the 28th edition of the Miss Teen International pageant, was held on July 30, 2022, at the GNH Convention Centre in Gurugram, India. Aayushi Dholakia of India crowned her successor Ngô Ngọc Gia Hân of Vietnam by the end of the event. This is Vietnam's first Miss Teen International title and the second Asian win in 29 years.

Final results

(●): The candidate won the Miss People's Choice Award (online voting) and got direct entry into Top 10 Finalists.  <small>

Continental Queens of Beauty

Special awards

Contestants

  – Danitsja Schoutteet
  – Gimhani Mohau Perera
  – Panha Vimealea Dy
  – Angeli Desarie Lachica
  – Rashi Parasrampuria
  – Graciela Soares
  – Nabila Villanueva
  – Emujin Naranbold
  – Alexis Swart
  – Samikshya Niraula
  – Anne Brouwer
  – Eurica Cielo C. Abarro
  – Beatriz Nogueira
  – Venera Stanisavljevic
  – Mieke Van Der Merwe
  – Teppawee Sung-ong
  – Alessandra Gonzalez
  – Ngô Ngọc Gia Hân
  – Kee-Vonne Hunda

References

External links
 

2022 beauty pageants
Beauty pageants in India
2022 in India